Vendeuvre is a commune in the Calvados department in the Normandy region in northwestern France.

Population

Sights
Château de Vendeuvre and its gardens with labyrinth, cascades, kiosk, temple, cave with shells.

See also
Communes of the Calvados department

References

Communes of Calvados (department)
Calvados communes articles needing translation from French Wikipedia